Linn Joanna Elsa Ahlborg (born 4 September 1999) is a Swedish blogger and YouTube personality.

Linn runs one of Sweden's largest YouTube channels with almost 370,000 subscribers and over 500,000 followers on instagram. Her blog with over 2.5 million readers a week makes Linn's blog one of Sweden's largest blogs. She also runs the limited company Linn Ahlborg AB.

Career
She has had several blogs until she started her current one in 2013. By 2018 her blog is the most visited one at blog portal Nouw with approximately 868 247 page views per week. Since 2012 Ahlborg vlogs frequently on YouTube, with all content being in Swedish.

Awards and nominations

References

External links

Youtube Profile

1999 births
20th-century Swedish people
21st-century Swedish people
21st-century Swedish women writers
Swedish bloggers
Swedish women bloggers
Swedish YouTubers
People from Gävle
Living people